Ruth Ann Baldwin was a journalist who became a silent film writer and director active during the 1910s, one of the few women to direct in the early era of filmmaking. Despite the fact that she was one of the first female directors in America, not much is known about her, but the work she did in the 1910s was relevant to the society she lived in.

Early life
Ruth Ann Baldwin was born in September 1886 in West Suffield, Connecticut, to Charles Baldwin and Abby Taylor. Her father died when she was young, and she and her mother relocated to the San Diego, California, area. Ruth Ann attended school in National City, where her musical talents were evident, before forging a career as a journalist.

After working as a society columnist at The San Diego Sun, she appears to have moved to Los Angeles around 1913. She was engaged to be married to Walter Bullard Ridgeway, a landscape architect, that same year, although that marriage does not seem to have taken place.

Baldwin later married actor Leo Pierson, who appeared in many of the films she directed, including her two feature films, A Wife on Trial and '49–'17.

Career
In 1913, Universal Film Manufacturing Company hired Baldwin as a writer. She wrote scenarios for a number of films produced over the next few years, beginning with Damon and Pythias (1914). Most of the films for which she received writing credit are shorts, but Baldwin also contributed to feature-length films.

In December 1914, Universal sent Baldwin to London to assist E. Phillips Oppenheim with turning his, The Black Box into a 15-episode serial. Phillips was an experienced novelist, but The Black Box was the first of his works to be adapted for film and Baldwin had gained a reputation for scenario expertise.

In August 1916, after working for Universal for several years as a writer and a six-month stint as a film editor, Baldwin became a director for Universal. Her first directorial effort was The Mother Call (1916), a one-reel drama.

In 1917, she directed a feature-length film called A Wife on Trial. Based on the novel The Rose Garden Husband, and starring her husband and Mignon Anderson, the film centers on a girl who dreams of owning a garden and ends up marrying a paralyzed man who owns one. Critic Robert C. McElravy of Moving Picture World opined, "... it gets over extremely well and will please the average audience immensely".

Post-directing
49–'17 is considered Baldwin's final directorial effort. Following 49–'17, Baldwin left Universal and returned to screenwriting. From 1919 until around 1921, Baldwin wrote scenarios and screenplays for many more films.

In June 1921, Baldwin joined the Clubhouse of the Screen Writers Guild, and was elected to the board of directors.

References

1886 births
American women film directors
Film directors from California
Silent film directors
Year of death missing
Women film pioneers
American journalists
American women journalists